Michel Fournier (born 9 May 1944) is a French adventurer and retired Air Force colonel. He has been involved in planning attempts to break freefall jumping height records, but has yet to be successful in carrying out an attempt. He was born in Treban (Allier), in the Auvergne region of France.

Parachuting experience
According to the French version of his own biography, he (Michel Fournier) claims to have a total of more than 8,700 jumps in 2011, including a French record of height in freefall at 12,000 m.
However, his parachuting experience was disputed by Patrick de Gayardon
and the magazine Paramag. No official institution has ever confirmed one of his titles.

Le Grand Saut
Fournier has attempted to make record breaking freefall jumps on three occasions. In 1998, the French space agency chose Fournier to conduct a record jump to test the ability of astronauts to survive reentry without a space craft. This project was quickly canceled. In 2003, Fournier attempted his first privately financed jump but the balloon ripped while being filled. The New York Times reports that Fournier has spent "nearly $20 million" on his two private attempts.

His freefall was expected to last 15 minutes.

The jump was expected to take place over the plains of Saskatchewan, Canada. After several delays due to weather, the attempt was made on 27 May 2008, but the balloon detached from its capsule as it was being inflated and floated away. Another attempt was made on 16 May 2010 which was unsuccessful due to the skydiver's reserve parachute deploying inside the capsule during a pre-launch test while the balloon was being filled.

The next attempt was announced for May 2011, delayed until August and then apparently postponed to 2012.

See also
Parachuting
Yevgeni Andreyev
Felix Baumgartner
Alan Eustace
Joseph Kittinger
Nick Piantanida
Cheryl Stearns
Steve Truglia

References

 Burkhard Bilger, Falling, The New Yorker, 13 August 2007. Abstract
 Leonard David, Space Diver Prepares For Big Jump, space.com, 13 July 2006

External links 
 Le Grand Saut project official website 

1944 births
Living people
French Air and Space Force personnel
French balloonists
French skydivers
Sportspeople from Allier
Space diving